CMA CGM Corte Real is the third Explorer class containership built for CMA CGM. It is named after Portuguese explorer Gaspar Corte Real. It was delivered in August 2010.

References

Container ships
Corte Real
Corte Real
Ships built by Daewoo Shipbuilding & Marine Engineering
2009 ships